Cabobanthus is a genus of plants in the family Asteraceae, native to tropical Africa. Its species were formerly placed in the genus Vernonia.

Species
, Plants of the World Online recognises the following species:
Cabobanthus bullulatus 
Cabobanthus polysphaerus

References

Vernonieae
Asteraceae genera